The Academy of Medical Sciences of Iran was formally inaugurated in the winter of 1990. It had received its mandate from the High Council of Cultural Revolution and Legislature of the Islamic Republic of Iran two years earlier and its existence had been foreseen in the 1986 Charter of the Ministry of Health and Medical Education. It is one of the four academies of the Islamic Republic of Iran. The other three are: Academy of Sciences of Iran, Iranian Academy of the Arts and Academy of Persian Language and Literature.

Organization 
The Academy consists of the president of the country as the director of the academy, a general assembly, the president of the academy (currently Iradj Fazel), a vice-president for research (currently Reza Malekzadeh), a scientific council, and a secretary. The Academy publishes Archives of Iranian Medicine, a peer-reviewed medical journal.

Objectives 
Among the major objectives of The Academy of Medical Sciences of Iran are the development of medical sciences and techniques as well as reinforcement of the spirit of research, the attainment of scientific and cultural independence, promotion of the level of the national medical sciences, attainment of the latest findings and, innovation in the field of medical science through collective endeavors and encouragement of prominent scientists and researchers.

Members 
The Academy has three types of members including Permanent, Associate and Honorary. The first two types require Iranian citizenship and the last is open to other nationalities. Permanent membership is lifelong.

See also
 Healthcare in Iran
 Higher education in Iran
 Science and technology in Iran

References

External links 
 

Organizations established in 1990
National academies
Iranian Academy of Medical Sciences